Mitt i ett andetag is a 2011 studio album by Titanix.

Track listing
Nu är det lördag igen ("Another Saturday Night") (Sam Cooke/ Hans Sidén)
Night by the Lake (Daniel Nilsson/Henrik Szabo/Christina Schilling /Camilla Gottschalck/Jonas Gladnikoff)
Om du bara visste (Stefan Brunzell /Ulf Georgsson)
Vi dansar så kärleksfullt i natten (Kalle Kindbom /Jari Kujansuu)
Kärleken (Jerry Rolf)
So Long (Benny Andersson/ Björn Ulvaeus)
Här står jag (Thomas Thörnholm/Dan Attlerud)
Överallt (Calle Kindbom/Carl Lösnitz /Niclas Edberger)
Varje gång nån frågar om dig (Bo Nilsson, Henrik Henriksson)
Hot n Cold (Lukasz Gottwald/Max Martin /Katy Perry)
Vem vill va min ängel (Mikael Olsson/Joakim Mullo)
Be Careful What You're Wishing for (Kenneth Westlin/Sören Jonsson /Camilla Andersson)

Charts

References 

2011 albums
Titanix albums